Claremontiella is a genus of small, predatory sea snails, related to the genera Tenguella and Muricodrupa. Its members are marine gastropod molluscs in the family Muricidae, the murex snails or rock snails. 

In 2013, genetic analysis indicated that Morula nodulosa was not closely related to the main group of Morula species, but rather was sister to a Tenguella–Muricodrupa clade.  In response, the new genus Claremontiella was proposed in 2019, including C. nodulosa as type species, its close relative C. consanguinea, and a newly-described species: C. adiakritos.

Claremontiella is named in honor of researcher Martine Claremont.

Species
 Claremontiella adiakritos Houart, Zuccon & Puillandre, 2019
 Claremontiella consanguinea (E. A. Smith, 1890)
 Claremontiella nodulosa (C. B. Adams, 1845)

Notes

References 

 
Ergalataxinae
Taxa described in 2019